The Women's 10,000 metres event featured at the 2005 World Championships in the Helsinki Olympic Stadium. The final was held on 6 August.

Medalists

Finishing times

References
IAAF results 

Events at the 2005 World Championships in Athletics
10,000 metres at the World Athletics Championships
2005 in women's athletics